Bharat Sanchar Nigam Limited (d/b/a BSNL) is a central public sector undertaking headquartered in New Delhi, India. It is under the ownership of Department of Telecommunications, Ministry of Communications, Government of India. It was incorporated on 1 October 2000 by the Government of India. Its top official is designated as Chairman and Managing Director who is a central government civil servant of the Indian Communication Finance Service cadre or a central government engineer of the Indian Telecommunications Service cadre. It provides mobile voice and internet services through its nationwide telecommunications network across India. It is the largest government-owned-wireless telecommunications service provider in India.

Name
The name Bharat Sanchar Nigam Limited derives from Hindi, which means India Communications Corporation Limited in English.

History
Bharat Sanchar Nigam Limited is India's government enterprise and its history can be traced back to the British India. The foundation of telecom network in India was laid by the British sometime during the 19th century. During the British era, the first telegraph line was established between Calcutta and Diamond Harbour in 1850. The British East India Company started using the telegraph in 1851 and until 1854 telegraph lines were laid across the country. In 1854, the telegraph service was opened to the public and the first telegram was sent from Mumbai to Pune. In 1885, the Indian Telegraph Act was passed by the British Imperial Legislative Council. After the bifurcation of Post and Telegraph department in the 1980s, the creation of Department of Telecom eventually led to the emergence of the government owned telegraph and telephone enterprise which led to the foundation of BSNL.

For 160 years, BSNL had operated the public telegram service. In 2010 the telex network between its 182 offices was replaced with the "Web Based Telegram Messaging System" which relied on internet connections rather than telex lines (which are more reliable where power outages are more common). This led to a decline in service, and the company applied the title "diminished service" to telegrams in 2010. Finally on 15 July 2013 the public telegram service was shut down completely.

Products and services

Telephone and Mobile
BSNL provides both fixed line telephones and mobile telephony services on GSM platform.

BSNL Mobile

BSNL Mobile is a major provider of GSM network under brand name CellOne and BSNL all over India. It has wide network coverage in both urban and rural areas of India. It has over 121.82 million customers across India.

BSNL Mobile offers prepaid, postpaid services and value-added services such as Free Phone Service (FPH), India Telephone Card (Prepaid card), Account Card Calling (ACC), Virtual Private Network (VPN), Tele-voting, Premium Rate Service (PRM). It also offers the IPTV which enables customers to watch television through the Internet and Voice and Video Over Internet Protocol (VVoIP).

BSNL Landline
BSNL Landline was launched in early 1990s. It was the only fixed-line telephone serving for whole country before the New Telecom Policy was announced by the Department of Telecom in 1999. Only the Government-owned BSNL and MTNL were allowed to provide land-line phone services through copper wire in the country. BSNL Landline is the largest fixed-line telephony in India. It has over 9.55 million customers and 47.20% market share in the country as of 28 February 2021.

Internet
BSNL is the fourth largest ISP in India, with having presence throughout the country. It also has the largest fibre-based telecom network in the country, around 7.5 lakh kilometers, among the four operators in the country.

BSNL Broadband

BSNL Broadband provides telecom services to enterprise customers including MPLS, P2P and Internet leased lines. It provides fixed-line services and landline using CDMA technology and its own extensive optical fiber network. BSNL provides Internet access services through dial-up connections as prepaid, NetOne as postpaid, and DataOne as BSNL Broadband.

BSNL Bharat Fiber
BSNL Bharat Fiber (FTTH) was launched in February 2019. It offers TV over IP (IPTV), Video On-Demand (VoD), Voice over Internet Protocol (VoIP), Audio On-Demand (AoD), Bandwidth On-Demand (BoD), remote education, video conferencing services, interactive gaming, Virtual Private LAN services. BSNL said that, its huge optic fiber network provides fixed access to deliver high-speed Internet up to 300 Mbit/s.

Bharat Net
With effect to Govt. of India's policy decision to provide state-owned BSNL with another revival package worth 1.64 lakh crore rupees, the struggling PSU was merged with Government's special purpose vehicle BBNL. This gave the struggling PSU a boost and an additional advantage of additional 5.67 lakh kilometre of optical fibre which has been laid across 1.85 lakh village panchayats in the country using the Universal Service Obligation Fund (USOF). Currently, it has an optical fibre cable network of over 6.83 lakh kilometre.

BSNL 4G
BSNL started 4G service in some parts of India since January 2019 such as Bihar, Jharkhand and Uttar Pradesh, but is limited to a few cities or towns. Most of 4G services are currently available in Southern India. However, BSNL is trying to launch pan India 4G services up to September 2022. The telecom minister said that BSNL will launch its 4G services all over India on 75th Independence day of India along with various other projects.

BSNL 5G
On behalf of the Govt. of India, the hon'ble Minister of Communications Ashwini Vaishnaw announced that the State-Owned Telco would start its 5G operations by 15 August 2023. He also added that the 4G and 5G network of the state-owned BSNL would be a completely home-grown indigenous 4G and 5G network technology; thus, emphasising more on Govt. of India's Atmanirbhar Bharat.

IP services

BSNL Wing Services
On 16 August 2018, BSNL has launched "BSNL Wings Services" in 22 telecom circles in which, there is no need of SIM card or cable wiring as is a VoIP service through an app. It offers unlimited free calling for one year throughout India.

Administrative units

BSNL vertical divisions

BSNL is primarily divided into three verticals

BSNL - Consumer Fixed Access (CFA), wire line and broadband business.
BSNL - Consumer Mobility (CM), wireless business, primarily 3G/4G GSM services, WLL-M services. 
BSNL - Enterprise Business, Enterprise customers on turnkey basis.
Other than these three verticals, there are electrical wings and civil wings which take care of real estate monetization.

BSNL horizontal divisions

Horizontally, BSNL is divided into a number of administrative units, variously known as: telecom circles, metro districts, project circles and specialized units. It has 24 telecom circles, two metro districts, six project circles, four maintenance regions, five telecom factories, three training institutions and four specialized telecom units. Each circle is being headed by a Chief General Manager (CGM) who is an officer of Indian Telecom Service (ITS).

The organisational structure of BSNL is as follows: Chief General Manager being the head of the Circle who is the officer of HAG+ level, assisted by three or four Principal General Manager (PGM) who is the officer of grade HAG. The districts over a circle is being headed by the designations as General Manager officer of grade of SAG who looks over around two to four districts, while where the connections are less and the smaller district is being headed by Telecom District Manager (TDM) Officer of the grade of JAG and Telecom Divisional Engineer (TDE) officer of STS grade, all the officers above the post of TDE (including TDE) are of Group A and they are the officers of grade of Indian Telecom Service (ITS) directly or promotive. Then the Group B consists of Additional Divisional Engineer, Sub Divisional Engineer and Junior Telecom officer and then the organisation has Group C and D employees.

Merger and acquisitions
On 24 October 2019, the Government of India has announced revival package for BSNL and MTNL which includes monetising assets, raising funds, TD-LTE spectrum, voluntary retirement scheme for employees. Apart from package, the Ministry of Communications has decided to merge MTNL with BSNL. Pending this, MTNL will be a wholly owned subsidiary of BSNL.

On 24 October 2019, the Government of India has announced revival package for BSNL and has given its nod for in-principal merger (operational merger, i.e. only the operations of MTNL and BSNL would be merged and to be managed by BSNL) for MTNL and BSNL

On 27 July 2022, the Government of India announced another revival package for the state-owned BSNL, for providing 4G and 5G services making the PSU more viable and vibrant and turning it into a profit making organisation; under this policy decision the government also merged BBNL with BSNL.

Controversies

Cyber Attack
In July 2017, BSNL had suffered a cyber attack which affected south India, especially Karnataka, when a malware affected the telco's broadband network using modems with default passwords. The virus has reportedly affected 60,000 modems and blocked their internet connectivity. Later BSNL issued an advisory notice to its broadband customers, urging them to change their default router username and passwords.

See also 

Government of India
BSNL Broadband
BSNL Mobile
Mahanagar Telephone Nigam Limited
Telecommunications in India
List of telecom companies in India
List of mobile network operators

References

External links
 Official website

Government-owned companies of India
Indian companies established in 2000
Companies based in New Delhi
Telecommunications companies of India
Internet service providers of India
Telecommunications companies established in 2000
Government-owned telecommunications companies
2000 establishments in Delhi